I Am Not (stylized as I am NOT) is the debut extended play (EP) by South Korean boy group Stray Kids. The EP was released digitally and physically on March 26, 2018 by JYP Entertainment and distributed through Iriver. A debut showcase titled Stray Kids Unveil: Op. 01: I Am Not was held the day before. The album sold 54,733 physical copies for the month of March.

The album was released in two versions physically—an “I am” version and a “NOT” version.

Track listing
Credits adapted from Melon

Charts

Weekly charts

Year-end charts

Certifications

Notes

References

2018 debut EPs
JYP Entertainment EPs
Korean-language EPs
Stray Kids EPs
IRiver EPs